Morawa may refer to:
 Morawa, Western Australia
 Shire of Morawa
 Morawa, Lower Silesian Voivodeship (south-west Poland)
 Morawa, Warmian-Masurian Voivodeship (north Poland)

See also

 Morava (disambiguation)